Professor Bede Nwoye Okigbo (born September 29, 1926, died March 31, 2017) is a plant pathologist and geneticist, traditionalist and former Vice-Chancellor of University of Nigeria, Nnsukka.

Early life and education
Bede Nwoye Okigbo, from Ireh town of Ojoto in Anambra State, was born into the family of the Okigbos who were popular for their academic pursuits and achievements in the 20th century Nigeria. His father, Chief 'Ozo' Nnebue Okigbo was a high-ranking chief in his community and an arch-traditionalist. He attended the Government College, Umuahia in 1943 where he developed his love for agriculture and plants and completed his secondary education. From 1948 - 52, he studied at Moor Plantain, Ibadan. Subsequently, he attended the Washington State University on a Ford Foundation scholarship and earned his bachelor's graduate in 1953 on Botany, and Cornell University to earn his PhD in Agronomy in 1958.

Academic career 
Bede was a former Director of the United Nations University Programme on Natural Resources, Nairobi, and was amongst the pioneer agronomists in Nigeria with specialisation in plant breeding and entomology. He also was, at different times, the dean of agriculture at the University of Nigeria, deputy director at the International Institute for Tropical Agriculture (IITA), Ibadan, and Director of Natural Resources Programme at the United Nations University, Japan. He also taught crop science and genetics and experimenting with food crops cultivation, and has presented papers to the international community on local agricultural and farming practices, amongst others.

Military stint 
During the Biafran War, Bede was the coordinator of a unit known as the Land Army whose remit was to boost large scale and small agriculture practices down to the grassroot level. He was the Dean of Agriculture at the University of Nigeria, Nsukka at that point.

Personal life 
Bede was married to his wife, Philomena and they have six children.

Honors 
Bede was honored by the National Universities Commission at its second 'Nigerian Universities Distinguished Professors Awards', for his outstanding excellence and contribution to the educational sector. He was also a Knight of St. Mulumba (KSM).

Later life and death 
He presented a paper at the Ahiajoku Festival in 1980 and retired to Ojoto in 1997. He took up the traditional Ozo title and was named Eze-Okigbo 1 n'Ojoto. He died on 31 March, 2017.

References 

Cornell University alumni
Fellows of the African Academy of Sciences